Shesh Uttar is a 1980 Bangladeshi film starring Bulbul Ahmed and Shabana opposite him. Bulbul bagged Bangladesh National Film Award for Best Actor. It also stars Ilias Kanchan. It is produced and written by Ahmed Zaman Chowdhury himself.

Soundtrack

Awards 
6th Bangladesh National Film Awards
Best Actor - Bulbul Ahmed

References

1980 films
Bengali-language Bangladeshi films
Films scored by Robin Ghosh
Films directed by Azizur Rahman (film director)
1980s Bengali-language films